Bagienice Małe refers to the following places in Poland:

 Bagienice Małe, Masovian Voivodeship
 Bagienice Małe, Warmian-Masurian Voivodeship